The Apple Tree Girl or  The Apple-Tree Girl is a 1917 American silent drama film directed by Alan Crosland and starring Shirley Mason, Raymond McKee and Jessie Stevens.

Cast
 Shirley Mason as Charlotte Marlin 
 Joyce Fair as Margaret Pennington 
 Jessie Stevens as Ma'me Bazin 
 Raymond McKee as Neil Kennedy 
 Edward Coleman as Willis Hayland 
 Mabel Guilford as Lady Standish 
 Graham Doubble as Bannister Hughes 
 Harry Hollingsworth as Perry Graham 
 Andy Clark as Peter 
 Mabel Strickland as Grace Pennington 
 William Wadsworth as Philip Pennington

References

Bibliography
 Goble, Alan. The Complete Index to Literary Sources in Film. Walter de Gruyter, 1999.

External links

1917 films
1917 drama films
Silent American drama films
Films directed by Alan Crosland
American silent feature films
1910s English-language films
American black-and-white films
Edison Studios films
1910s American films